Andromache Mourning Hector is a 1783 oil-on-canvas painting by the French Neoclassical artist Jacques-Louis David. The painting depicts an image from Homer's Iliad, showing Andromache, comforted by her son, Astyanax, mourning over her husband Hector, who has been killed by Achilles. This painting, presented on 23 August 1783, brought David election to the Académie Royale in 1784.

References

Mythological paintings by Jacques-Louis David
1780s paintings
Paintings in the Louvre by French artists
Paintings depicting Greek myths
Cultural depictions of the Trojan War
Paintings about death
Paintings based on the Iliad